Milivoje Stojanović (Serbian Cyrillic: Миливоје Стојановић; 18 September 1873 – 4 December 1914) was a Serbian military commander who served during the Balkan Wars and during the Serbian Campaign (part of the larger Balkans Campaign) during World War I.

After his death in the Battle of Kolubara, Serbian composer Stanislav Binički composed the March on the Drina in his honour.

Career
Stojanović graduated from the military academy with the 22nd class and became an infantry lieutenant in 1892.

After the conquest of Rajčanski rid, as a key ground for victory in the Battle of Bregalnica, the commander of the First Army, Crown Prince Alexander I, was so delighted with the performance of the XII Regiment that he personally approached Stojanović (who commanded the unit), congratulated him, and removed the Order of Karađorđe's Star (with swords) from his chest and personally stuck it on the chest of Stojanović.

Death and legacy
In the First World War in 1914, his Second Iron Regiment took part in the Battle of Cer, in its very center, on Tekeriš. He also distinguished himself as the commander of the Iron Regiment in the Battle of Kolubara. During the Battle of Kolubara, he contracted pneumonia. Seeing that his men were dying, Stojanović, although seriously ill, personally led the regiment in a new assault, and on that occasion Kremenica was conquered and Stojanović was killed. The March on the Drina was composed in his honour.

A comic book publisher dedicated to the First World War called Linije fronta (Front Lines) published the comic book Gvozdeni (Iron) dedicated to Stojanović and his death during the Battle of Kolubara.

In the film King Petar of Serbia, Stojanović is played by actor Dragan Boža Marjanović.

References

1873 births
1914 deaths
Military personnel from Požarevac
People from the Principality of Serbia
People from the Kingdom of Serbia
Serbian soldiers
Royal Serbian Army soldiers
Serbian military personnel of the Balkan Wars
Serbian military personnel of World War I
Serbian military personnel killed in World War I